is a Shinto shrine located in the city of Ōtsu, Shiga Prefecture Japan. This shrine is one of the Twenty-Two Shrines. The head shrine in Ōtsu heads the seventh largest shrine network in Japan,  with approximately 3800 Hiyoshi, Hie, and Sannō shrines nationwide. Torii of this shrine have a distinctive configuration, known as the "Sannō torii", with a gaggle above the main crossbeam.

Enshrined kami 
Main shrine
 Nishi Hongū: 
 Higashi Hongū: 
Subsidiary shrines
 Ushio-gū: 
 Juge Jinja: 
 Sannomiya-gū: 
 Usa-gū: 
 Shirayama-gū:

History 
The first mention of the kami Oyamakui is recorded in Kojiki, written in the 8th century AD, which states that this god resides at Mount Hiei, which is located immediately to the east of Hiyoshi Taisha. This kami was relocated from the summit of the mountain to its present location in the seventh year of the reign of the semi-legendary Emperor Sujin, or 90 BC per the traditional calendar. In 668 AD, Emperor Tenji decided to relocate the capital to Ōmi Province and built the Ōtsu Palace. At this time, the kami of Ōmiwa Shrine in Yamato Province (who served as protector of the imperial dynasty) was relocated as well, and was installed in the Nishi Hongū, whereas the original sanctuary came to be called the Higashi Hongū. In 788 AD, Saichō erected the Tendai Buddhist temple complex of Enryaku-ji on Mount Hiei. After the transfer of the capital to Heian-kyō, Enryaku-ji and by extension, Hiyoshi Taisha came to be guardians of the spiritually vulnerable northeast quadrant from the capital. As Enryaku-ji became ever more powerful, and the Buddhist faith gradually amalgamated with Shinto under the Shinbutsu-shūgō policy, Hiyoshi Taisha was subsumed into Enryaku-ji. As missionaries from Enryaku-ji built Buddhist temples all across Japan, they also spread the faith in the "Sannō Gongen" and the Hie kami.

The shrine became the object of Imperial patronage during the early Heian period.  In 965, Emperor Murakami ordered that Imperial messengers were sent to report important events to the guardian kami of Japan, and Hie Taisha was added to this listing by Emperor Go-Suzaku in 1039. This unique number of Imperial-designated shrines has not been altered since that time.

During the late Heian period, political troubles arose between Enryaku-ji and the secular government in Kyoto. It became the practice of the warrior-monks from the temple to carry a mikoshi portable shrine from Hie Taisha into the capital and to riot to enforce their political will. Soon after the kanpaku Fujiwara no Moromichi dared to oppose the riots by stopping the mikoshi, he died under mysterious circumstances, which the temple was quick to attribute to a curse from the gods for having shown disrespect to the mikoshi. The mikoshi of Hei Taisha thus became an object of fear and awe, and the temple used the tactic of running riot with the mikoshi to obtain their will on more than 40 occasions over a 370+ year period into the Sengoku period.

The practice was stopped in 1571 when Oda Nobunaga ordered Enryaku-ji to be razed to the ground, and all of its monks to be massacred. This also included Hie Taisha. The shrine was rebuilt under Toyotomi Hideyoshi, with the oldest buildings currently at the shrine dating from the period of 1586 to 1597. Toyotomi Hideyoshi had a deep faith in the Sannō Gongen, as his childhood name was "Hiyoshi Maru" and his nickname was "monkey", an animal which was considered to be the spiritual messenger of the Hie kami. The Nishi Hongū was reconstructed in 1586 and the Higashi Hongū in 1595. Tokugawa Ieyasu also had faith in the Sannō Gongen and the shrine was supported by the Tokugawa shogunate. 

In 1868 (the first year after the Meiji restoration), the new Meiji government decreed the separation of Shinto and Buddhism. Hie Taisha was at the forefront of this effort, and was one of the first to burn or otherwise its Buddhist statuary, ritual implements and scriptures. This was the beginning of the nationwide Haibutsu kishaku movement.

Gallery

See also 
 Twenty-Two Shrines
 List of National Treasures of Japan (shrines)
List of Historic Sites of Japan (Shiga)

References

 Breen, John and Mark Teeuwen. (2000).  Shinto in History: Ways of the Kami. Honolulu: University of Hawaii Press. 
 Ponsonby-Fane, Richard. (1962).   Studies in Shinto and Shrines. Kyoto: Ponsonby Memorial Society. OCLC 399449
 . (1959).  The Imperial House of Japan. Kyoto: Ponsonby Memorial Society. OCLC 194887
 Hieizan Rekishi no Sampomichi, Kodansha, 1995,

External links 

山王総本宮　日吉大社 - Hiyoshi Taisha's official website (Japanese)

Kanpei-taisha

Shinto shrines in Shiga Prefecture
Buildings and structures in Ōtsu
National Treasures of Japan
Important Cultural Properties of Japan
Historic Sites of Japan
Religious buildings and structures completed in 1586
 Beppyo shrines